SS Lewis L. Dyche was a Liberty ship built by the Oregon Shipbuilding Corporation for the United States Maritime Commission during World War II. The ship was named in honor of Lewis Lindsay Dyche. Lewis Lindsay Dyche (1857–1915) was an American naturalist and also the creator of the Panorama of North American Plants and Animals, which was featured in the Kansas Pavilion at the 1893 World's Columbian Exposition. The ship was assigned by the War Shipping Administration, she operated by Interocean Steamship Company of San Francisco during World War II. Lewis L. Dyche was laid down on 6 November 1943, launched on 26 November 1943 and completed on 9 December 1943, with the hull No. 807 as part of the Emergency Shipbuilding Program, built is 38 days.

World war 2
SS Lewis L. Dyche was loaded with bombs and fuses for the Pacific Ocean theater of World War II in San Francisco.

SS Lewis L. Dyche joined one-hundred-ship convoy TG 77.11, that was under the command of Captain J. B. McLean, The convoy was screened and protected by nine destroyers. The convoy headed to Mindoro an island in Luzon of the Philippines to support the Battle of Mindoro. The convoy arrived in the Philippines on December 28. As soon as the convoy arrived it was under almost continuous attack. Before arriving the PT tender  was hit by a kamikaze plane. Liberty ships SS William Sharon and SS John Burke were both hit also. Burke sank with a large explosion and  Sharon's had a large fire on her superstructure. LST-750 was sunk later in the day. On December 30 the convoy arrived Mangarin Bay in the morning. Five Imperial Japanese Navy (IJN) Aichi D3A started suicide attacks. The SS Francisco Morozan was damaged when kamikaze plane exploded over the ship after it is shot down by US Navy plane.

On January 4, 1945, just South of Mindoro, a Japanese kamikaze plane crashed into the Lewis L. Dyche. The cargo of ammunition exploded and the ship disintegrated, killing all crew members. Killed were the 28-man US Navy Armed Guard and 43 the merchant marines. The explosion was so large that the ship's debris damaged other ships nearby, including the oil tanker USS Pecos and the minelayer .

See also
 Allied technological cooperation during World War II
 List of Liberty ships
 Type C1 ship
 Type C2 ship
 Victory ship
 U.S. Merchant Marine Academy

External links
U.S. Maritime Service Veterans

References

Liberty ships
Ships built in Portland, Oregon
1943 ships
Maritime incidents in January 1945
Ships sunk by kamikaze attack